Frederick Redwood (born 6 October 1964) is a Jamaican cricketer. He played in twelve first-class and thirteen matches for the Jamaican cricket team from 1991 to 1996.

See also
 List of Jamaican representative cricketers

References

External links
 

1964 births
Living people
Jamaican cricketers
Jamaica cricketers
People from Clarendon Parish, Jamaica